Hymenoxys tweediei is a South American species of flowering plant in the daisy family. It has been found mostly in Uruguay with a few populations in northeastern Argentina (Entre Rios Province) and southern Brazil (Rio Grande do Sul).

Leaves are divided in thin, narrow segments. Flower heads each contain 135-196 disc flowers and 7-9 ray flowers.

References

External links

tweedei
Flora of Uruguay
Flora of Argentina
Flora of Brazil
Plants described in 1841